The Horse Park of New Jersey is a  park that holds equestrian events, located in Upper Freehold, in Monmouth County, New Jersey, United States, with an Allentown address.

History
The Horse Park of New Jersey was conceived by equestrian enthusiasts concerned about the dwindling amount of land dedicated to their interests and activities. The Horse Park opened in 1987 on land initially purchased by the New Jersey Department of Environmental Protection with Green Acres funds and centrally located in Monmouth County in the area's equine-oriented countryside, based on the input of the state's Equine Advisory Board.

Facilities
The Horse Park of New Jersey is located on County Route 524, seven miles from exit 7A of the New Jersey Turnpike and one mile from exit 11 of I-195. The park is approximately a 50-minute drive from Philadelphia and just over one hour from New York City.

The park currently has: 
276 stalls in permanent buildings
Two show rings
Grand prix and carriage dressage arena
Fenced and lighted schooling ring
Dressage warm-up ring
Indoor arena
Multi-purpose pavilion for sheltered viewing, trade fairs, auctions and clinics
Secretary's office, including lounge, press room and announcer's booth

References

External links 

1987 establishments in New Jersey
Buildings and structures in Monmouth County, New Jersey
Equestrian organizations
Parks in Monmouth County, New Jersey
Upper Freehold Township, New Jersey